Schaumboch's Tavern is a historic inn and tavern building located in the Hawk Mountain Sanctuary at Albany Township, Berks County, Pennsylvania. It was built about 1793, and is a 1 1/2-story, rectangular stucco coated sandstone building.  It has a medium gable roof with a shed dormer on the rear elevation. It was once owned by Matthias Schaumboch, who is alleged to have murdered at least 11 traveling salesman and hucksters.  The property was acquired as part of the Hawk Mountain Sanctuary in 1938, and is used to house sanctuary personnel.

It was added to the National Register of Historic Places in 1979.

References

Hotel buildings on the National Register of Historic Places in Pennsylvania
Hotel buildings completed in 1793
Buildings and structures in Berks County, Pennsylvania
National Register of Historic Places in Berks County, Pennsylvania
1793 establishments in Pennsylvania